New Albany  is a city in Floyd County, Indiana, United States, situated along the Ohio River, opposite Louisville, Kentucky. The population was 37,841 as of the 2020 census. The city is the county seat of Floyd County. It is bounded by I-265 to the north and the Ohio River to the south, and is considered part of the Louisville, Kentucky Metropolitan Statistical Area. The mayor of New Albany is Jeff Gahan, a Democrat; he was re-elected in 2019.

History

Early history

The land of New Albany was officially granted to the United States after the American Revolutionary War. The territory had been captured by George Rogers Clark in 1779. For his services Clark was awarded large tracts of land in Southern Indiana including most of Floyd County. After the war, Clark sold and distributed some of his land to his fellow soldiers. The area of New Albany ended up in the possession of Col. John Paul.

New Albany was founded in July 1813 when three brothers from New York —Joel, Abner, and Nathaniel Scribner—arrived at the Falls of the Ohio and named the site after the city of Albany, New York. They purchased the land from Col. John Paul. New Albany was platted by John Graham on land owned by the Scribner brothers. In 1814, Joel and Mary Scribner built their home in New Albany; the Scribner House still stands today.

New Albany was incorporated as a town in 1817 as part of Clark County. In 1819, three years after Indiana was admitted as a state, New Albany became the seat of government for newly established Floyd County. A courthouse was finally built in 1824.

New Albany grew rapidly and was the largest city in Indiana from 1816 until 1860, when it was overtaken by Indianapolis. Before the Civil War, over half of Hoosiers worth over $100,000 lived in New Albany, making it by far the wealthiest part of the state. The steamboat industry was the engine of the city's economy during the mid-19th century. Fueled by abundant forests for lumber, at least a half-dozen shipbuilders were in operation and turned out a multitude of steamboats and packet boats, including the Robert E. Lee, Eliza Battle, the Eclipse, and the A.A. Shotwell. Shipbuilding was accompanied by a wide range of ancillary business including machine shops, foundries, cabinet and furniture factories, and silversmith shops. Its second largest business was the American Plate Glass Works.

In 1847, the city was connected to the port at Michigan City, Indiana on Lake Michigan via the Monon railroad. In 1853, the New Albany High School opened, the first public high school in the state. The original school was built at the corner of West First Street and Spring Street. New Albany would also be the first in the state to create a consolidated school district several years later.

Ashbel P. Willard, governor of the state of Indiana, dedicated the Floyd County Fairgrounds in 1859. That year, the Indiana State Fair was held in New Albany. During the Civil War, the fairgrounds were converted to become Camp Noble and used as a muster point for the area's regiments.

Civil War
During the Civil War, New Albany served as both a supply center for Union troops and as a medical care center for wounded soldiers. Up to 1,500 wounded soldiers were treated in New Albany during the war, many non-medical buildings were converted into makeshift hospitals. 
In 1862, Abraham Lincoln established one of the first seven national cemeteries in New Albany for burying the many war dead. Despite the ongoing war, a new courthouse was built in 1865, which was used until the 1960s, when the current City-County courthouse was constructed, also the first in Indiana.

The Town Clock Church, now the Second Baptist Church, was used as the New Albany stop in the Underground Railroad. The original steeple was destroyed by a lightning strike in 1915, and a new replica steeple wasn't completed until 101 years later in 2016.

During the American Civil War the trade with the South dwindled as New Albany was boycotted by both sides, by Confederates because it was in a Union state and by the North because it was considered as too friendly to the South. Indianapolis overtook New Albany as Indiana's largest city in 1860, and across the river, Louisville's population grew much faster, New Albany never regained its original stature. The once robust steamboat industry ended by 1870, with the last steamboat built in New Albany named, appropriately, the Robert E. Lee.

During the second half of the 19th century, New Albany experienced an industrial boom despite the collapse of the steamboat industry. The advent of the railroad created economic opportunity for the city as a pork packing and locomotive repair center. A bridge was built across the Ohio River in 1886, providing a rail and road connection with Kentucky. American Plate Glass Works opened in 1865 which employed as many as 2,000 workers. When the factory relocated in 1893, New Albany lost a large part of its population and went into economic decline.

20th century

In the early 20th century, New Albany became a center of plywood and veneer, and its largest employer was the New Albany Veneering Company. By 1920, New Albany was the largest producer of plywood and veneer in the world, with other producers including Indiana Veneer Panel Company and Hoosier Panel Company.

On March 23, 1917, a tornado struck the north side of New Albany, killing at least 46 people.

Interstate 64 was built through New Albany in 1961 and led to the construction of the Sherman Minton Bridge. The project cost $14.8 million. The bridge was named for US Senator and later Supreme Court Justice Sherman Minton, who was a native of nearby Georgetown and practiced law in New Albany. The bridge was named the "most beautiful long-span bridge of 1961" by the American Institute of Steel Construction.

Education innovation
Charles A. Prosser lived in New Albany for much of his life. Charles Allen Prosser School of Technology was named in honor of his accomplishments as the "father of vocational education."
In the mid and late 20th century, New Albany became an innovator in using electronic media in education. New Albany High School, a public school, started WNAS-FM in 1949, which is the nation's oldest continuously operating high school radio station. In the late 1960s, Slate Run Elementary School started WSRS, a non-licensed student-produced closed-circuit television service for its classrooms, one of the nation's first in an elementary school.

Ohio River flood

In January 1937, a major flood struck the region. New Albany, like the other river towns, had no flood walls and no methods of regulating the river. The Ohio River rose to 60.8 feet at New Albany, leaving most of the town under 10 or more feet of water for nearly three weeks. The flood was the worst disaster to befall the city.

After the flood, New Albany was the first city in the region to begin construction on massive flood walls around the city. New Albany's flood walls served as examples for those constructed around Louisville and Clark County.

Geography
New Albany is located at  (38.301935, −85.821442).

Demographics

2010 census
As of the census of 2010, there were 36,372 people, 15,575 households, and 9,175 families living in the city. The racial makeup of the city was 85.8% White, 8.7% African American, 0.2% Native American, 0.7% Asian, 1.7% from other races, and 2.9% from two or more races. Hispanic or Latino of any race were 3.7% of the population.

There were 15,575 households, of which 29.9% had children under the age of 18 living with them, 35.4% were married couples living together, 18.2% had a female householder with no husband present, 5.2% had a male householder with no wife present, and 41.1% were non-families. 33.7% of all households were made up of individuals, and 11.1% had someone living alone who was 65 years of age or older. The average household size was 2.27 and the average family size was 2.89.

The median age in the city was 37.1 years. 22.9% of residents were under the age of 18; 10.1% were between the ages of 18 and 24; 26.9% were from 25 to 44; 26.4% were from 45 to 64; and 13.9% were 65 years of age or older. The gender makeup of the city was 47.5% male and 52.5% female.

2000 census
As of the census of 2000, there were 37,603 people, 15,959 households, and 10,054 families living in the city. The racial makeup of the city was 84.00% White, 12.93% African American, 0.31% Native American, 0.42% Asian, 0.04% Pacific Islander, 0.67% from other races, and 1.62% from two or more races. 1.36% of the population is Hispanic (Hispanics can be of any race).

There were 15,959 households, out of which 29.6% had children under the age of 18 living with them, 42.5% were married couples living together, 16.1% had a female householder with no husband present, and 37.0% were non-families. 30.8% of all households were made up of individuals, and 11.7% had someone living alone who was 65 years of age or older. The average household size was 2.31 and the average family size was 2.88.

In the city, the population was spread out, with 24.0% under the age of 18, 9.6% from 18 to 24, 29.2% from 25 to 44, 21.8% from 45 to 64, and 15.4% who were 65 years of age or older. The median age was 37 years. For every 100 females, there were 88.5 males. For every 100 females age 18 and over, there were 84.6 males.

The median income for a household in the city was $34,923, and the median income for a family was $41,993. Males had a median income of $31,778 versus $24,002 for females. The per capita income for the city was $18,365. About 11.4% of families and 13.7% of the population were below the Poverty threshold, including 21.6% of those under age 18 and 9.1% of those age 65 or over.

Attractions

New Albany's Main Street features a large collection of late 19th century mansions from the city's heyday as a shipbuilding center. The centerpiece is the Culbertson Mansion, a three-story French Second Empire Style structure, which is today an Indiana state memorial.

Every October, the downtown area of New Albany hosts the Harvest Homecoming festival, one of the largest annual events in the state. Festivities begin on the first weekend of October, but the main part, consisting of midway rides, shows, and booths lining the downtown streets, lasts from Thursday-Sunday of the second weekend in October. The 2020 Harvest Homecoming was cancelled due to the coronavirus pandemic.

Education
Indiana University Southeast, one of the eight campuses of the Indiana University system, is located on the northern edge of the city. The Purdue Polytechnic Institute also maintains a satellite campus in the city.

New Albany-Floyd County Consolidated School Corporation operates public schools. The Children's Academy of New Albany is the public preschool program.

Elementary schools in the city limits include:
 Fairmont Elementary School
 Green Valley Elementary School
 Mount Tabor Elementary School
 S. Ellen Jones Elementary School
 Slate Run Elementary School

Grant Line Elementary School is in an unincorporated area near New Albany.

Middle schools in the city limits include:

Hazelwood Middle School 
Nathaniel Scribner Middle School.

New Albany High School is the city's senior high school with the city being in its attendance boundary.

The Greater Louisville Regional Japanese Saturday School (グレータールイビル日本語補習校 Gurētā Ruibiru Nihongo Hoshūkō), a Japanese weekend supplementary school, is affiliated with IUS's Japan Center. It was established in January 1988 and holds its classes at Hillside Hall; its office is elsewhere in New Albany.

The city has a free lending library, the New Albany-Floyd County Public Library.

Notable people

 Jamey Aebersold – jazz musician, publisher of "play-along" music books
 William Wallace Atterbury (1866-1935) - Brigadier General in the U.S. Army during World War I
 Carl Braden – Civil Rights activist
 Pomeroy Cannon - Physician, stage and film actor
 William Cochran - Indiana state legislator and businessman
 Rob Conway – pro wrestler
 Josh Dallas – Actor who was born in Louisville, KY but went to New Albany High School; Josh Dallas is famous for playing Fandral in Thor, Thor: Tales of Asgard and Prince Charming/David Nolan in Once Upon a Time
 Aubrey Hampton (1934–2011) – biochemist and writer
 Billy Herman (1909–1992) – infielder in Major League Baseball during 1930s and 1940s; holds many National League defensive records for second basemen.
 Houndmouth – American alternative blues band
 Edwin Hubble – astronomer and namesake of Hubble Space Telescope; was a physics and Spanish teacher and basketball coach at New Albany High School during the 1913–1914 academic year
 Ferdinand N. Kahler (1864–1927) – inventor, entrepreneur and automobile pioneer
 Karen Kamensek –  Grammy nominated orchestral and operatic conductor
 J. Warren Kerrigan – actor, was born in New Albany
 Charles M. La Follette – member of Congress, was born in New Albany
 Romeo Langford – basketball player
 Dusty Ray Bottoms - a drag queen and musical artist who competed on RuPaul's Drag Race (season 10)
 John MacLeod – college and pro basketball coach
 Max Macon – Major League Baseball pitcher/first baseman and scout, Minor League manager
 George W. Maher – early 20th Century Prairie School style architect
 Jouett Meekin – Major League Baseball pitcher who won 153 games
 Sherman Minton – United States Supreme Court Justice who ruled in the landmark Brown v. Board of Education case in 1954. After retirement, he practiced law in New Albany and was buried in the city's Holy Trinity Catholic Cemetery next to Leo Receveur. The I-64 double-decker bridge that crosses the Ohio River between New Albany and Louisville, Kentucky is named for him.
 Rondale Moore – football player
 Lucy Higgs Nichols (1838–1915) – escaped slave and Civil War nurse, who has a memorial marker on E. Market Street
 Charles Allen Prosser – the father of Vocational education – C. A. Prosser School of Technology in New Albany is named in his honor
 Craig Pumphrey – police officer, television presenter and martial artist
 Four Reno Gang members were lynched in the New Albany Jail by masked vigilantes from Jackson County in 1868
 Joseph Ritter – Roman Catholic archbishop and Cardinal
 David H. Rodgers – Mayor of Spokane, Washington
 Roscoe Sarles – Indy Car driver
 Shanda Sharer (1979–1992) – twelve-year-old torture murder victim
 Thomas Smith – Justice of the Indiana Supreme Court
 Mike Sodrel – former congressman of Indiana's 9th district
 Evan B. Stotsenburg – President Pro Tempore of the Indiana Senate; Indiana Attorney General (1915-1917) 
 John M. Stotsenburg – U.S. Army colonel killed in Philippine–American War
 Laura M. Hawley Thurston (1812–1842), poet, teacher
 Camille Wright Thompson (born in 1955) – silver medalist in swimming at 1976 Summer Olympics in Montreal, graduate of New Albany High School, University of Hawaii
 S. C. Thompson – editor
 Ashbel P. Willard – 11th Governor of Indiana
 Fuzzy Zoeller – PGA golfer with 20 tour victories, 1979 Masters champion, 1984 U.S. Open champion, 2002 U.S. Senior champion

See also

 List of mayors of New Albany, Indiana
 List of cities and towns along the Ohio River
 New Albany High School
 Indiana University Southeast

Footnotes

Further reading
 Lawrence M. Lipin, Producers, Proletarians, and Politicians: Workers and Party Politics in Evansville and New Albany, Indiana, 1850-87. Urbana, IL: University of Illinois Press, 1994.

External links

 City of New Albany, Indiana website
 
 New Albany Glass Works/Star Glass Works, New Albany

 
Cities in Indiana
Populated places on the Underground Railroad
County seats in Indiana
Louisville metropolitan area
Cities in Floyd County, Indiana
Indiana populated places on the Ohio River
1813 establishments in Indiana Territory
Populated places established in 1813